The Treat Commercial Building is a historic commercial building on Oak Street, between High and 4th Streets, in Leslie, Arkansas.  It is a single-story brick structure, with a vernacular early-20th century storefront and sharing party walls with its neighbors.  The front has a pair of plate glass windows flanking a recessed entrance, and is topped by a parapet.  The interior retains original fixtures and a coffered pressed-metal ceiling.  Built in 1910, it is one of Leslie's oldest commercial buildings.

The building was listed on the National Register of Historic Places in 1993.

See also
National Register of Historic Places listings in Searcy County, Arkansas

References

Commercial buildings on the National Register of Historic Places in Arkansas
Commercial buildings completed in 1910
Buildings and structures in Searcy County, Arkansas
National Register of Historic Places in Searcy County, Arkansas